The Hendrik Hudson, formally known as the Hendrik Hudson Residence Hotel, is a Tuscan-style apartment building located on Riverside Drive in Morningside Heights, Manhattan, New York City.  The first plans for a building named for Hendrik Hudson on Riverside Drive were announced in October 1897 by Eugene Kirby, a former manager of the Marie Antoinette Hotel.  This was to be an 18-story hotel.  These plans were never completed, however, and by 1907, an apartment building bearing the name had been constructed instead.

History

In order to take advantage of the New York City Subway's newly opened line in the area, developers George F Johnson and Aleck Kahn purchased three-quarters of the block defined by Riverside Drive, Broadway, West 110th Street and 111th Street in order to build an apartment complex.  The architectural firm of Rouse & Sloan was hired to design and construct the building.  The project was led by William L Rouse, and the result was an eight story building modeled after a Tuscan Villa, containing 72 apartment units.  The building also featured two towers, on the north and south sides, connected by a promenade.  The apartments officially opened on October 1, 1907, and the units were quickly rented.  Due to this success, a 12 story annex, also designed by William Rouse, was constructed.

The apartment building continued to enjoy success for several decades, until the aftermath of the 1943 rent-control law caused it to rapidly deteriorate.  The current landlords of the building were brought to court in 1958 due to the slum-like conditions of the building, and were sentenced to a 30-day jail term.  This, along with the investigation of the accidental death of a small child in the building, prompted renovations to be carried out in 1959.  In 1971, the Hendrik Hudson became a co-op, and the north tower was removed.  In 1996, the decision was made to preserve the deteriorating south tower as a "stabilized ruin", despite its preservation costing more than demolishing it.

References

Further reading 
 

Cultural history of New York City
Condominiums and housing cooperatives in Manhattan
Apartment buildings in New York City
Residential buildings completed in 1907
Morningside Heights, Manhattan